Self Made is the debut studio album by American rapper Rocko, which includes the singles "Umma Do Me", "Tomorrow", and "Dis Morning". Guest artists on the album include Lloyd, KC, Dre, and Monica, and was released by Rocky Road Records, So So Def Recordings and Island Records on March 18, 2008.  The album scored negative reviews.  This is the first album released from So So Def Recordings not to have any production from Jermaine Dupri.

Track listing

Charts

Weekly charts

Year-end charts

Release history

Sales
The album debuted at number 21 on the U.S. Billboard 200 chart, selling 70,000 copies in its first week.

See also
2008 in hip hop

References

2008 debut albums
Island Records albums
Rocko (rapper) albums
Albums produced by Cool & Dre
Albums produced by the Runners
Albums produced by Drumma Boy
Albums produced by Fatboi
Albums produced by J.U.S.T.I.C.E. League